The Olympus M.Zuiko Digital ED 14–42 mm f/3.5-5.6 L is a Micro Four Thirds System lens by Olympus Corporation. It is sold as part of a kit along with bodies for all cameras in the Olympus PEN series (the E-P1, E-P2 and E-PL1).

The lens is available in black or silver.

References

14-42mm F3.5-5.6 L
Camera lenses introduced in 2010